Sarah Cain is an American contemporary artist.

Life
Cain was born in Albany, New York, and grew up in nearby Kinderhook. She moved to California in 1997 to study art at the San Francisco Art Institute, where she received her BFA in 2001. She went on to study at the University of California, Berkeley, receiving her MFA in studio art and attended the Skowhegan School of Painting and Sculpture in 2006.

Work

Cain uses a variety of materials, including traditional canvas, stretcher bars, and paint, as well as less common artifacts, including musical notations, leaves and branches.

Quinn Latimer described Cain's work: "They court seemingly bad ideas—drawings sport feathers and doilies; installations feature eggs and hippy art teacher-like fabric swatches—and then transform them so deftly into serious painting that it can take a minute to understand what you’re looking at." In 2011, Cain collaborated with George Herms at the Orange County Museum of Art, where the curator Sarah Bancroft wrote for the accompanying catalog that the two artists share "an interest in language and a frustration over its limits in describing abstract work".

She has had solo exhibitions at Institute of Contemporary Art, Los Angeles, the Aspen Art Museum, San Diego Museum of Contemporary Art, amongst others. And has been included in collective exhibitions at Los Angeles County Museum of Art, Imperial Belvedere Palace Museum in Vienna, and the Busan Biennale. In 2019, she completed her first major permanent public work at San Francisco International Airport: a 150-foot stained glass window with 270 colors, framed in soldered zinc, which was "painstakingly arranged so that no two adjoining fragments are the same shade."

Poet Bernadette Mayer in her poem "Dear Sarah", described a painting by the artist as "it's like seeing a rainbow in the middle of the forest."

Selected exhibitions

Sarah Cain: My Favorite Season is the Fall of the Patriarcy, National Gallery of Art, Washington, DC , 2021
Sarah Cain: Opener 33 - Enter the Center, the Tang Museum at Skidmore College, Saratoga Springs, NY, 2021
Sarah Cain: In Nature, The Momentary at the Crystal Bridges Art Museum, Bentonville, AR, 2021
Sarah Cain, Aspen Art Museum at the Elk Camp on Snowmass Mountain, CO, 2017
Sarah Cain: Now I'm going to tell you everything, Institute of Contemporary Art, Los Angeles (ICA LA), CA, 2017
Sarah Cain: The Imaginary Architecture of Love at Contemporary Art Museum Raleigh, Raleigh, NC, 2015
Sarah Cain: blue in your body, red when it hits the air at Museum of Contemporary Art San Diego, La Jolla, CA, 2015
Painting in Place, Los Angeles Nomadic Division, Los Angeles, CA, 2013
Gold, Curated by Thomas Zaunschirm, Imperial Belvedere Palace Museum, Vienna, 2012
SECA Art Award Exhibition, San Francisco Museum of Modern Art, San Francisco, CA, 2007
Sarah Cain: I Believe We Are Believers, Anthony Meier Fine Arts, San Francisco, CA, 2006
Sarah Cain: A River of If's, Queens Nails Annex, San Francisco, CA, 2005

References

External links
 

American contemporary painters
1979 births
Living people
20th-century American painters
21st-century American painters
Artists from Los Angeles
Artists from Albany, New York
UC Berkeley College of Letters and Science alumni
San Francisco Art Institute alumni
20th-century American sculptors
20th-century American women artists
21st-century American women artists
American women painters
Skowhegan School of Painting and Sculpture alumni
Sculptors from California
Sculptors from New York (state)